Pablo Artal (born June 12, 1961, in Zaragoza) is a Spanish physicist and full professor specialized in optics at the University of Murcia, as well as in the development and application of new techniques in human vision research. He received the Rey Jaime I Award for New Technologies in 2015. His main research topics are the optics of the eye and the retina and the development of optical and electronic imaging techniques in the field of biomedicine, ophtalmology and vision. He has contributed to the advance of methods for the study of the optics of the eye and contributed to the understanding of the factors that limit the resolution of the human vision. Moreover, his discoveries and ideas have been applied to instruments and devices used in the clinical practice of ophthalmology.

Biography 
After earning a MSc degree in physics from the University of Zaragoza, he joined the Institute of Optics of the Higher Council of Scientific Research (CSIC) located in Madrid as a PhD student in 1984. His PhD supervisor was Javier Santamaria. After his doctorate he was a post-doctoral fellow at the University of Cambridge, UK and the  Institut d'Optique, Orsay (France).

Back to Spain, he became a permanent researcher at the Institute of Optics (CSIC). Since 1994 he has been the first Full Professor of Optics at the University of Murcia, and was the funder of the Optics Laboratory. He is also an elected fellow member of the Optical Society of America (OSA), fellow of the Association for research in Vision and Ophthalmology (ARVO) and the European Optical Society (EOS). He is a member of the Academy of Sciences of the Region of Murcia and the Academy of Medicine and a distinguished visiting professor at the Central South University in Changsha (China).

He was awarded with the Edwin H. Land Medal  by the OSA and the Society for Imaging Science and Technology (IS&T) for his pioneer work in the diagnostic and correction alternatives in visual optics (2013). The European Research Council granted Artal with an Advanced Research grant in 2014 with a total budget of 2.5 million euros for the creation of optoelectronic glasses. He received the 'Rey Jaime I' Award for New Technologies in 2015. The mention states that he hold more than 20 international patents and was founder of five companies in the field of optics... [which] has helped to improve the quality of life of people around the world." In May 2016, he announced that he dedicated 20,000 of the 100,000 euros obtained from the Rey Jaime I to support ten scholarships for the most talented undergraduate students enrolled in the science degrees at the University of Murcia. Artal won the Juan de la Cierva Spanish National Research Award in 2018 and the Edgar D. Tillyer award of the OSA for “the pioneering use of optics and photonics technologies to unravel the human visual system and to improve eye diagnostics and correction”.

At the current time, Artal is co-inventor of 25 patents in the Optics and Ophtalmology fields  and the co-founder of two spin-off companies (Voptica SL & Visiometrics SL) focused on optical solutions and diagnostic instruments. According to Google Scholar, he has published more than 200 scientific studies with more than 16.000 citations and with a h-index of 69. He has participated in more than 200 invited presentations in international meetings and approximately 150 seminars in scientific institutions across the world. He edited the two-volume “Handbook of Visual Optics” in 2017.

References

External links 
 Google Scholar: list of Pablo Artal's citations.
 Pablo Artal's member profile at UM Laboratorio de Óptica.

1961 births
Academic staff of the University of Murcia
University of Zaragoza alumni
Spanish physicists
People from Zaragoza
Living people